Chamunda Bindrasaini is an urban municipality located in Dailekh District of Karnali Province of Nepal.

The municipality is divided into total 9 wards.

The municipality was established on 10 March 2017, when Government of Nepal restricted all old administrative structure and announced 744 local level units as per the new constitution of Nepal 2015.

Lyati Bindraseni, Chamunda and Jambukandh Village development committees were Incorporated to form this new municipality. The headquarters of the municipality is situated at Jambukandh

Demographics
At the time of the 2011 Nepal census, 99.0% of the population in Chamunda Bindrasaini Municipality spoke Nepali and 0.9% Tamang as their first language; 0.1% spoke other languages.

In terms of ethnicity/caste, 24.0% were Thakuri, 20.5% Kami, 20.4% Hill Brahmin, 19.9% Chhetri, 6.2% Damai/Dholi, 4.6% Magar, 2.1% Sarki, 1.1% Tamang, 0.6% Sanyasi/Dasnami and 0.7% others.

In terms of religion, 96.5% were Hindu and 3.5% Buddhist.

References

External links
http://chamundabindrasainimun.gov.np/

Populated places in Dailekh District
Municipalities in Karnali Province